Donji Kraji or Donji Krajevi (Lower Regions or Lower Ends), was a small medieval zemlja (county, župa) in today's northwestern Bosnia and Herzegovina, mostly expanding within the territory of today's Bosanska Krajina.

Name and geography 
At first, Donji Kraji referred to a region around Ključ on the Sana. Marko Vego derives the name of Donji Kraji from the name of Roman province Lower Pannonia, or later Lower Slavonia, while Pavao Anđelić deduces that the name Donji Kraji (Lower Ends) "also has a certain relation to the rest of (highland) Bosnia", where the terms "Lower" and "End" refers to a border area that is below from the geographical point of view, and in terms of altitude and terrain configuration, in relation to the rest of Bosnia. Jelena Mrgić reject existence of "Donji Kraji Slavonije" altogether, and reject previous etymological discussions among historians, such as Klajić, Jiriček and even Vego, and derives the county name, similarly to Pavao Anđelić, from geography (altitude and topography) and political demarcation as a product of solely local Bosnian origin. From the 13th century, texts referring to it as "Donji kraji Bosne" or "Donji kraji Bosanski, or "Donji kraji bosanske zemlje". During the reign of Hrvatinić family, since the beginning of 13th century, the territory of Donji Kraji included areas and parishes around Sana river, Glaž, to Grmeč mountain on the west and to the middle course of the Vrbas river on the east, thus covering entire region of Sanica, and later included Uskoplje, Pliva, Luka, Vrbas, Zemljanik (Resnik), Vrbanja, Tribava (Trijebovo), Mel, Lušci and Banjica, and on occasions Dubica and sometimes even Usora. Vjekoslav Klaić by invoking primary sources and document from 1244, as well as Mrgić, placed the territory of Donji Kraji in northern Bosnia, west from Usora county. This is confirmed by Konstantin Josef Jireček who said: "The Lower Ends (das Unterland) lies in the northwestern (Bosnia) toward Croatia, encompassing Kotor on the Vrbanja, Jajce and Ključ on the Sana (Kotor ander Vrbanja, Jajce, Ključ an der Sana u. S. W.)". From the Bosnian Cyrillic scripts of the written monuments, we know that Lušci village was in the Lower Ends but this place is not known today.

History

Early history 
In the 2nd half of the 12th century, the Banate of Bosnia, governed by Ban Borić, a Hungarian vassal, was confined to the regions of central Bosnia. By 1167, the Banate of Bosnia and parts of the Croatia were captured by the Byzantine Empire, including the parishes of Pliva, Luka, and Vrbanja, where the county of Donji Kraji would later develop. With the death of Emperor Manuel I Komnenos in 1180, the Byzantines lost the acquired lands. The area of Donji Kraji was granted to Bosnian Ban Kulin by King Bela III for his assistance in the wars with the Byzantines. Kulin's influence was restricted to the centre of his banate, as the regions to which he expanded have retained de facto independence.

The first indirect mention of Donji Kraji was in 1230, when Ban Matej Ninoslav granted the right of tithe collection to the Bishop of Bosnia. That was mentioned in a bull (decree) by King Bela IV of Hungary dated 20 July 1244, where he emphasized that it was previously granted by Matej Ninoslav. Later, other rulers such as Ban Prijezda had estates in these lands. Prijezda granted the Zemljanik parish to his son-in-law and the oldest son of Slavonian Ban Stjepan Babonić in 1287. At the end of the 13th century, the Babonić family also had the Vrbanja parish in Donji Kraji in their possession. It is not known when they obtained this parish.

Following the death of King Ladislaus IV in 1290, a war of succession broke out between the Árpád dynasty, supported by most of the Hungarian nobles, and the House of Anjou, with the support of most of the Croatian nobility. During the succession crisis, Croatian Ban Paul I Šubić greatly expanded his holdings, including the Banate of Bosnia in 1299, where he replaced Stephen I as Lord of Bosnia. The Hrvatinić family of Donji Kraji also submitted to Paul I Šubić. The eponymous founder of the Hrvatinić family, Hrvatin Stjepanić, held the title of "Knyaz of Donji Kraji Bosanske zemlje". The title was mentioned in a charter from 1299, issued by King Charles II of Naples of the Anjou family to the Hrvatinić and Šubić families, in which he named Hrvatin Stjepanić and his brothers as owners of Donji Kraji. In order to secure Hrvatin's loyalty, Paul I Šubić issued a charter in 1301 in which he committed to protect Hrvatin and his holdings. Hrvatin was referred to in the charter as the "Knyaz of Donji Kraji of Bosnia" (de inferioribus Bosne confinibus). Paul I Šubić appointed his brother, Mladen I Šubić, as Ban of Bosnia in 1302. Hrvatin Stjepanić and Mladen I Šubić had disputes over Hrvatin's holdings in Donji Kraji and other affairs. In 1304, Paul I Šubić intervened and sided with Hrvatin, and the Šubić family gave assurances for his possessions in Donji Kraji. At the time, Hrvatin held the Lušci and Banjica parishes of Donji Kraji.

14th century 

Knyaz Hrvatin died sometime before 1315, and was succeeded by his sons Vukoslav, Pavao, and Vukac. Hrvatin's sons sided with a coalition of the leading Croatian nobles in a revolt against Mladen II Šubić, who succeeded his father Paul I Šubić in 1312 and was the Ban of Bosnia since 1304. The revolt ended with Mladen's defeat at the Battle of Bliska in 1322 at the hands of Slavonian Ban John Babonić. From that point John Babonić took-over as a new Ban of Croatia, where as in Bosnia Stephen II Kotromanić, a formerly Šubić's vassal, replaced Mladen II as Ban of Bosnia.

Since the 2nd half of 1322, Stephen II called himself "lord of all Bosnian lands, Soli, Usora, Donji Kraji, and Hum". After 1322 and before 1325, the Hrvatinići recognized the authority of Stephen II. As a result of that, around 1326, Stephen II granted Vukoslav Hrvatinić the parishes of Vrbanja with the town of Ključ, which was until 1322 owned by the Babonići, and Banjica with the town of Kotor. The local nobles of the Banjica and Vrbanja parishes previously sided with Mladen II and did not want to accept Stephen II as Ban. Thus, the charter confirmed Vukoslav his ancestral parishes (župas), and in the following years, the Hrvatinići gained control over almost the entire territory of Donji Kraji. During the short period between death of Ban Stjepan II and ascension of new ban in Tvrtko I, the county handled affairs more or less autonomously for a few years, although still nominally a part of the Banate of Bosnia.

In the coming years, Ban Stephen granted Hrvatinić brothers several župas in Donji Kraji, but they were never counts of the whole Donji Kraji county, instead, in the example of Vukoslav, who called himself as "Knyaz of Ključ", they were regional lords overseeing parts of the county granted to each of them. Third Hrvatin son, Vukac, ruled the župa of Vrbanje. This trend of granting the brothers župas and towns continued in the last charter of Ban Stephen II in 1351, which confirms to Paul and Vuk, heirs of Knyaz Vukoslav, the inherited estates. The town of Ključ was attributed to his third son, Vlatko Vukoslavić. In addition to Vukoslavić, Pavlović (sons of Knyaz Paul) and Vlatko Vukoslavić also later claimed their rights over Banjica. Vukac Hrvatinić was granted župa Luka by a new Bosnian ban Tvrtko I in a charter issued in 11 August 1366 for his loyalty during battles he waged against Hungarian king Louis I.

Donji Kraji under Hrvoje Vukčić   

After Vukac supported Tvrtko I against Hungary, they quickly came up through the ranks in Bosnia, while their most prominent member, Hrvoje Vukčić, along with major new possessions in Donji Kraji and Tropolje was awarded with the title Grand Duke of Bosnia. Hrvoje was the eldest son of Duke Vukac Hrvatinić. He was married to Jelena Nelipčić, granddaughter of the powerful Croatian noble Ivan I Nelipac (Prince Nelipić) and sister of Ivan III Nelipac (Ivaniš Nelipić). He is first mentioned in 1376 as being prince and knight during the reign of Hungarian king Louis I. He called himself Knyaz of Donji Kraji.  

With the help of Hrvoje, King Ostoja came to the throne in 1398. Sigmund broke into the Donji Kraji, but was suppressed by Hrvoje army. Ladislaus of Naples awarded him the title of Duke of Split, giving him the islands of Brač, Hvar and Korčula. He was awarded administration of large territories and the title of Herceg Split Viceroy of Dalmatia and Croatia, grand Duke of Bosnia and Duke of Donji Kraji. In doing so, he became Sigmund's largest opponent in Bosnia. 

In 1407, Sigmund led the Hungarian army and attacked Donji Kraji, but was stopped. The turning point came after the Sigmund victory in the Battle of Dobor (1408). Hrvoje did not personally participate in the battle, but the disaster of the Bosnian forces led him to reconcile with the Hungarian king. In doing so, he lost all the privileges he received from Ladislaus and his power declined. Hrvoje turned to the Ottomans and brought them to Bosnia resulting in the Battle of Doboj (1415) where Hungarians were defeated. He died at the beginning of 1416 after which his possessions disintegrated rapidly. His widow Jelena later married the Bosnian king Ostoja. 

Jajce, a major fortified caste, was built in the 14th century and initially was seat of Hrvoje Vukčić. It would become one of the capital cities of the Kingdom of Bosnia. After Hrvoje death Jajce has passed back to the royal domain. It was only royal domain located in Donji Kraji, as Stephen Thomas refers to it as "royal seat", and its citadel has a portal decorated by his Kotromanić royal coat of arms.

Internal struggles and Ottoman incursions 
Hrvoje left behind his son Balša who bore the title of Knyaz of the Donji Kraji, but he died in 1416 so the bulk of the Donji Kraji went to his cousin Juraj Vojsalić. Even before 1386, it is possible to see the effects of the Ottomans' influence in medieval Bosnia, after numerous raids. Events during the 1410s marked the beginning of their active engagement. The Ottoman Empire supported the local nobility, led by Tvrtko II. After the Battle of Lašva on the Lašva river (in 1415), the Ottomans and Hungary became the most powerful factor in the local affairs. Navigating between these two forces, bans and kings in Bosnia resisted pressures from both sides. Juraj supported 1434 Bosnian King Tvrtko II against Sandalj Hranić in the civil war.

Juraj was succeeded by his son Peter. The reign of Peter was marked by improved connections with the Pope who has repeatedly taken the Knyaz of Donji Kraji for protection, pointing out that he is the only one among the schismatic Bosnian rulers who has maintained true faith. He actively supported Vladislav Hercegović in the fight against his father, Stjepan Vukčić Kosača. Peter was last mentioned as alive in a Venetian document from 1456. 

Ottomans launched a surprise attack on Bosnia, when they re-directed their troops from their supposed attack towards Hungary. The fortresses were quickly overrun, and Stephen Tomašević fled from Jajce towards Donji Kraji, while Queen Catherine fled to the coast via Kozograd royal castle, and reached Dubrovnik. The Ottomans caught up to the king's forces at the fortress of Ključ on the Sana, where they imprisoned him and brought him back to Jajce, where he was beheaded in front of Mehmed the Conqueror.

Aftermath  
After the fall of the Kingdom of Bosnia under the rule of the Ottomans, Hungarian King Matthias Corvinus captured northern Bosnia in late 1464, including Donji Kraji, where he formed the Jajce county which was held until  1528. In this period the Jajce county covered the entire area of Donji Kraji, except the župa of Uskoplje, which then was under Ottoman rule. After the fall of the Jajce county, the region became part of the Sanjak of Bosnia. 

Bosanska Krajina is first mentioned in 1594.

List of župas

See also 
 Turkish Croatia
 History of Bosnia
 Walled city of Jajce

References

Sources 

 Benac A., Ed. (1986): Bosna i Hercegovina / Bosnia and Herzegovia / Bosnien und Herzegowina. Svjetlost, Sarajevo.

 
 Enciklopedija Jugoslavije, Ed. (1983): Socijalistička Republika Bosna i Hercegovina – Separat iz II izdanja Enciklopedije Jugoslavije. Jugoslavenski leksikografski zavod, Zagreb.

 

 Malcolm N. (1996): Bosnia: A Short History. New, Updating Edition, New York University Press, .

 

Banate of Bosnia
Historical counties of Bosnia and Herzegovina
Kingdom of Bosnia
Zemljas of the medieval Bosnian state
History of Bosanska Krajina